This article describes a theorem concerning the dual of a Hilbert space. For the theorems relating linear functionals to measures, see Riesz–Markov–Kakutani representation theorem.

The Riesz representation theorem, sometimes called the Riesz–Fréchet representation theorem after Frigyes Riesz and Maurice René Fréchet, establishes an important connection between a Hilbert space and its continuous dual space. If the underlying field is the real numbers, the two are isometrically isomorphic; if the underlying field is the complex numbers, the two are isometrically anti-isomorphic. The (anti-) isomorphism is a particular natural isomorphism.

Preliminaries and notation 

Every real Hilbert space can be extended to be a dense subset of a unique (up to bijective isometry) complex Hilbert space, called its complexification, which is why Hilbert spaces are often automatically assumed to be complex. Real and complex Hilbert spaces have in common many, but by no means all, properties and results/theorems. 

This article is intended for both mathematicians and physicists and will describe the theorem for both. 
In both mathematics and physics, if a Hilbert space is assumed to be real (that is, if ) then this will usually be made clear. Often in mathematics, and especially in physics, unless indicated otherwise, "Hilbert space" is usually automatically assumed to mean "complex Hilbert space." Depending on the author, in mathematics, "Hilbert space" usually means either (1) a complex Hilbert space, or (2) a real  complex Hilbert space.

Linear and antilinear maps 

In contrast, a map  is linear if it is additive and : 

Every constant  map is always both linear and antilinear. If  then the definitions of linear maps and antilinear maps are completely identical. A linear map from a Hilbert space into a Banach space (or more generally, from any Banach space into any topological vector space) is continuous if and only if it is bounded; the same is true of antilinear maps. The inverse of any antilinear (resp. linear) bijection is again an antilinear (resp. linear) bijection. The composition of two linear maps is a  map. 

Continuous dual and anti-dual spaces

One-to-one correspondence between linear and antilinear functionals

This assignment is most useful when  because if  then  and the assignment  reduces down to the identity map. 

The assignment  defines an antilinear bijective correspondence from the set of 
all functionals (resp. all linear functionals, all continuous linear functionals ) on  
onto the set of 
all functionals (resp. all linear functionals, all continuous linear functionals ) on

Mathematics vs. physics notations and definitions of inner product 

The Hilbert space  has an associated inner product  valued in 's underlying scalar field  that is linear in one coordinate and antilinear in the other (as described in detail below). 
If  is a complex Hilbert space (meaning, if ), which is very often the case, then which coordinate is antilinear and which is linear becomes a  important technicality. 
However, if  then the inner product is a symmetric map that is simultaneously linear in each coordinate (that is, bilinear) and antilinear in each coordinate. Consequently, the question of which coordinate is linear and which is antilinear is irrelevant for real Hilbert spaces. 

Notation for the inner product

In this article, these two notations will be related by the equality:

Competing definitions of the inner product

Explicitly, this means that for every fixed  the map that is denoted by 
 
and defined by 
is a linear functional on  
 In fact, this linear functional is continuous, so 
The map  is linear in its  coordinate; equivalently, the map  is linear in its  coordinate. Explicitly, this means that for every fixed  the map that is denoted by 
 
and defined by 
is an antilinear functional on 
 In fact, this antilinear functional is continuous, so 

In mathematics, the prevailing convention (i.e. the definition of an inner product) is that the inner product is  coordinate and antilinear in the other coordinate.
This article will not choose one definition over the other. 
Instead, the assumptions made above make it so that the mathematics notation  satisfies the mathematical convention/definition for the inner product (that is, linear in the first coordinate and antilinear in the other), while the physics bra–ket notation  satisfies the physics convention/definition for the inner product (that is, linear in the second coordinate and antilinear in the other). Consequently, the above two assumptions makes the notation used in each field consistent with that field's convention/definition for which coordinate is linear and which is antilinear.

Canonical norm and inner product on the dual space and anti-dual space 

If  then  is a non-negative real number and the map
 

defines a canonical norm on  that makes  into a normed space. 
 

 

 
where this inner product turns  into a Hilbert space. There are now two ways of defining a norm on  the norm induced by this inner product (that is, the norm defined by ) and the usual dual norm (defined as the supremum over the closed unit ball). These norms are the same; explicitly, this means that the following holds for every 
 

As will be described later, the Riesz representation theorem can be used to give an equivalent definition of the canonical norm and the canonical inner product on  

The same equations that were used above can also be used to define a norm and inner product on 's anti-dual space  

Canonical isometry between the dual and antidual

The complex conjugate  of a functional  which was defined above, satisfies 

for every  and every  
This says exactly that the canonical antilinear bijection defined by

as well as its inverse  are antilinear isometries and consequently also homeomorphisms. 

and

If  then  and this canonical map  reduces down to the identity map.

Riesz representation theorem 

which is always a closed vector subspace of  
The Hilbert projection theorem guarantees that for any nonempty closed convex subset  of a Hilbert space there exists a unique vector  such that  that is,  is the (unique) global minimum point of the function  defined by

Statement

Historically, the theorem is often attributed simultaneously to Riesz and Fréchet in 1907 (see references). 

Let  denote the underlying scalar field of  

 

Fix   
By the Cauchy–Schwarz inequality, 

which shows that  is bounded (equivalently, continuous) and that  
It remains to show that  
By using  in place of  it follows that 

(the equality  holds because  is real and non-negative). 
Thus that  

The proof above did not use the fact that  is complete, which shows that the formula for the norm  holds more generally for all inner product spaces. 

 

Then 

which shows that  is the constant  linear functional. 
Consequently  which implies that  

 

Let  
If  (or equivalently, if ) then taking  completes the proof so assume that  and  
Let 
 
Because  there exists some non-zero  
For any 

which shows that  where now  implies 
 
Solving for  shows that 

which proves that the vector  satisfies 
 

Applying the norm formula that was proved above with  shows that  
Also, the vector  has norm  and satisfies  

It can now be deduced that  is -dimensional when  
Let  be any non-zero vector.

The formulas for the inner products follow from the polarization identity.

Observations 

If  then 
 
So in particular,  is always real and furthermore,  if and only if  if and only if  

Linear functionals as affine hyperplanes

A non-trivial continuous linear functional  is often interpreted geometrically by identifying it with the affine hyperplane  (the kernel  is also often visualized alongside  although knowing  is enough to reconstruct  because if  then  and otherwise ). In particular, the norm of  should somehow be interpretable as the "norm of the hyperplane ".
 as follows: using the notation from the theorem's statement, from  it follows that  and so  implies  and thus  
The formulas 

Defining  the infimum formula 

will also hold when  

Constructions of the representing vector 

If  then ; in other words, 

Orthogonal complement of kernel

If  then for any  

If  is a unit vector (meaning ) then 

(this is true even if  because in this case ). 

Orthogonal projection onto kernel

If  is such that  and if  is the orthogonal projection of  onto  then

Orthonormal basis

 
If  is written as  then 

and

If the orthonormal basis  is a sequence then this becomes 
 
and if  is written as  then

Example in finite dimensions using matrix transformations 

 
Let  be any linear functional and let  be the unique scalars such that 
 
where it can be shown that  for all  

 
so that  is identified with  
As usual, also identify the linear functional  with its transformation matrix, which is the row matrix  so that  and the function  is the assignment  where the right hand side is matrix multiplication. Then for all 

which shows that  satisfies the defining condition of the Riesz representation of  
The bijective antilinear isometry  defined in the corollary to the Riesz representation theorem is the assignment that sends  to the linear functional  on  defined by 
 
 
As described in the corollary, 's inverse  is the antilinear isometry  which was just shown above to be: 
 
where in terms of matrices,  is the assignment 
 

This example used the standard inner product, which is the map  but if a different inner product is used, such as  where  is any Hermitian positive-definite matrix, or if a different orthonormal basis is used then the transformation matrices, and thus also the above formulas, will be different.

Relationship with the associated real Hilbert space 

Assume that  is a complex Hilbert space with inner product  
 

Let  and  denote the real and imaginary parts of a linear functional  so that  
The formula expressing a linear functional in terms of its real part is

where  for all  
It follows that  and that  if and only if  
In particular, a linear functional  is bounded if and only if its real part  is bounded. 

Representing a functional and its real part

The Riesz representation of a continuous linear function  on a complex Hilbert space is equal to the Riesz representation of its real part  on its associated real Hilbert space. 

Explicitly, let  and as above, let  be the Riesz representation of  obtained in  so it is the unique vector that satisfies  for all  
That is,  is the unique vector in  that satisfies  for all  
The conclusion is  
This follows from the main theorem because  and if  then 
 
and consequently, if  then  which shows that  
Moreover,  being a real number implies that 
In other words, in the theorem and constructions above, if  is replaced with its real Hilbert space counterpart  and if  is replaced with  then  This means that vector  obtained by using  and the real linear functional  is the equal to the vector obtained by using the origin complex Hilbert space  and original complex linear functional  (with identical norm values as well). 

Canonical injections into the dual and anti-dual 

Induced linear map into anti-dual

The map defined by placing  into the  coordinate of the inner product and letting the variable  vary over the  coordinate results in an  functional:

The   is the  operator 

which is also an injective isometry. 
The Fundamental theorem of Hilbert spaces, which is related to Riesz representation theorem, states that this map is surjective (and thus bijective). Consequently, every antilinear functional on  can be written (uniquely) in this form. 

If  is the canonical linear bijective isometry  that was defined above, then the following equality holds:

Extending the bra–ket notation to bras and kets 

Let  be a Hilbert space and as before, let  
Let 

which is a bijective antilinear isometry that satisfies

Bras

Given a vector  let  denote the continuous linear functional ; that is, 
 
so that this functional  is defined by  This map was denoted by  earlier in this article. 

The assignment  is just the isometric antilinear isomorphism  which is why  holds for all  and all scalars  
The result of plugging some given  into the functional  is the scalar  which may be denoted by  

Bra of a linear functional

Given a continuous linear functional  let  denote the vector ; that is, 
 

The assignment  is just the isometric antilinear isomorphism  which is why  holds for all  and all scalars  

The defining condition of the vector  is the technically correct but unsightly equality

which is why the notation  is used in place of  With this notation, the defining condition becomes

Kets

For any given vector  the notation  is used to denote ; that is, 
 

The assignment  is just the identity map  which is why  holds for all  and all scalars  

As expected,  and  really is just the scalar

Adjoints and transposes 

Let  be a continuous linear operator between Hilbert spaces  and  As before, let  and  

Denote by

the usual bijective antilinear isometries that satisfy:

Definition of the adjoint 

For every  the scalar-valued map  on  defined by 
 

 

 
The adjoint  is necessarily a continuous (equivalently, a bounded) linear operator. 

Adjoints are transposes 

 

Explicitly, the relationship between the adjoint and transpose is:

which can be rewritten as:

so that  holds if and only if  holds; but the equality on the right holds by definition of  
The defining condition of  can also be written
 
if bra-ket notation is used.

Descriptions of self-adjoint, normal, and unitary operators

Assume  and let  
Let  be a continuous (that is, bounded) linear operator. 

 

Self-adjoint operators

A continuous linear operator  is called self-adjoint it is equal to its own adjoint; that is, if  Using, this happens if and only if:

where this equality can be rewritten in the following two equivalent forms:

Unraveling notation and definitions produces the following characterization of self-adjoint operators in terms of the aforementioned continuous linear functionals:  is self-adjoint if and only if for all  the linear functional  is equal to the linear functional ; that is, if and only if

where if bra-ket notation is used, this is
 

Normal operators

A continuous linear operator  is called normal if  which happens if and only if for all  
 

Using and unraveling notation and definitions produces the following characterization of normal operators in terms of inner products of continuous linear functionals:  is a normal operator if and only if  

where the left hand side is also equal to  
The left hand side of this characterization involves only linear functionals of the form  while the right hand side involves only linear functions of the form  (defined as above). 
So in plain English, characterization says that an operator is normal when the inner product of any two linear functions of the first form is equal to the inner product of their second form (using the same vectors  for both forms).
In other words, if it happens to be the case (and when  is injective or self-adjoint, it is) that the assignment of linear functionals  is well-defined (or alternatively, if  is well-defined) where  ranges over  then  is a normal operator if and only if this assignment preserves the inner product on  

The fact that every self-adjoint bounded linear operator is normal follows readily by direct substitution of  into either side of  

Alternatively, for a complex Hilbert space, the continuous linear operator  is a normal operator if and only if  for every  which happens if and only if 

Unitary operators

An invertible bounded linear operator  is said to be unitary if its inverse is its adjoint:  
By using, this is seen to be equivalent to  
Unraveling notation and definitions, it follows that  is unitary if and only if  

The fact that a bounded invertible linear operator  is unitary if and only if  (or equivalently) produces another (well-known) characterization: an invertible bounded linear map  is unitary if and only if

See also

Citations

Notes 

Proofs

Bibliography

  
 
 P. Halmos Measure Theory, D. van Nostrand and Co., 1950.
 P. Halmos, A Hilbert Space Problem Book, Springer, New York 1982 (problem 3 contains version for vector spaces with coordinate systems).
 
 
  
 Walter Rudin, Real and Complex Analysis, McGraw-Hill, 1966, .
  

Articles containing proofs
Duality theories
Hilbert space
Integral representations
Linear functionals
Theorems in functional analysis